Kitchin is a surname, and may refer to:

 Alexandra Kitchin (1864–1925)
 Alvin Paul Kitchin (1908–1983)
 Anthony Kitchin (1471–1563)
 C. H. B. Kitchin (1864–1925)
 Claude Kitchin (1901–1923), member of the US House of Representatives from North Carolina
 David Kitchin, judge of the High Court of England and Wales
 Derwin Kitchen (born 1986), basketball player for Ironi Nahariya of the Israeli Basketball Premier League
 George Kitchin (1827–1912), first chancellor of the University of Durham
 Joseph Kitchin (1861–1932)
 Myfanwy Kitchin (1917–2002), British artist
 Rob Kitchin, British geographer
 Tom Kitchin, Scottish chef
 William H. Kitchin (1837–1901)
 William Walton Kitchin (1866–1924)

See also
 Lord Kitchin
 Kitchen (surname)